Boulder Mountains may refer to:

 Boulder Mountains (Idaho)
 Boulder Mountains (Montana)